Blackheath Football Club is a rugby union club based in Well Hall, Eltham in south-east London.

The club was founded in Blackheath in 1858, and is the fourth-oldest rugby club in continuous existence in the world, after Dublin University Football Club (1854), Liverpool St Helens F.C. (1857) and Edinburgh Academical Football Club (1857). The Blackheath club also assisted in organising the world's first rugby international (between England and Scotland in Edinburgh on 27 March 1871) and hosted the first international between England and Wales ten years later – the players meeting and getting changed at the Princess of Wales public house. Blackheath, along with Civil Service F.C., is one of the two clubs that can claim to be a founder member of both The Football Association and the Rugby Football Union.

The club currently play in National League 2 East, the fourth tier of the English rugby union system, with matches played at Well Hall, after a move from Rectory Field in Blackheath at the end of the 2015–16 season.

History

Early history

The institution was founded as "Blackheath Football Club" in 1858 by old boys of Blackheath Proprietary School who played a "carrying" game of football made popular by Rugby School. When the old boys played against the current pupils, supporters would shout for either "Club" or "School" accordingly. This is why to this day supporters of BFC shout for "Club", not for "Blackheath". In 1863 the club developed the tactic of passing the ball from player to player as an alternative to the solo break and the "kick and follow-up".

Blackheath is the fourth-oldest rugby club in continuous existence in the world, after Dublin University Football Club (1854), Liverpool St Helens F.C. (1857) and Edinburgh Academical Football Club (1857), but asserts it is the "oldest independent Rugby club, meaning that it was not attached to any institution such as a military establishment, hospital, school or college."

In 1863 Blackheath was a founder member of The Football Association which was formed at the Freemasons' Tavern, Great Queen Street, on Lincoln Inn Fields, London 26 October 1863 with the intention to frame a code of laws that would embrace the best and most acceptable points of all the various methods of play under the one heading of "football". Francis Maule Campbell, a member of Blackheath, was elected treasurer. At the fifth meeting Campbell argued that hacking was an essential element of 'football' and that to eliminate hacking would "do away with all the courage and pluck from the game, and I will be bound over to bring over a lot of Frenchmen who would beat you with a week’s practice." At the sixth meeting on 8 December Campbell withdrew Blackheath, explaining that the rules that the FA intended to adopt would destroy the game and all interest in it. Other rugby clubs followed this lead and did not join the Football Association. In this way the great divide between association football and rugby took place.

In December 1870 Edwin Ash, secretary of Richmond Football Club published a letter in the papers which said, "Those who play the rugby-type game should meet to form a code of practice as various clubs play to rules which differ from others, which makes the game difficult to play." On 26 January 1871 a meeting attended by representatives from 22 clubs was held in London at the Pall Mall Restaurant. As a result of this meeting the Rugby Football Union (RFU) was founded. Three lawyers who had been pupils at Rugby School drew up the first laws of the game which were approved in June 1871. The Club is one of seven of the original twenty-one clubs to have survived to this day.

Later history

Blackheath initially played its matches on the Heath (meeting and changing at the Princess of Wales public house) but occasional interruptions from spectators led the club to move, initially to a private field (Richardson's Field) in Blackheath before moving to the Rectory Field in 1883.

On 27 March 1871, England (captained by Blackheath's captain and with three other Club players in the 20-strong side) played Scotland at Raeburn Place, Edinburgh, losing by one point. This was the first international rugby union game in history. Richardson's Field hosted the first England v. Wales fixture on 19 February 1881, which England won, again with four Club players in the side.  In 1982 Blackheath joined the list of winning teams at the Glengarth Sevens at Stockport R.U.F.C.

Blackheath were one of the opponents for The Original All Blacks on their 1905–06 northern hemisphere tour, the first-ever New Zealand rugby union tour outside of Australasia. The touring side ran out 32–0 victors. 

After 158 years it was announced that the 2015–16 season would be the last playing at the historic Rectory Field as the club had made the difficult decision to move to their training ground, Well Hall in Eltham, for the 2016–17 season to maximise matchday revenue and to continue developing for the future. Blackheath played their last game at the Rectory Field on 30 April 2016, beating Blaydon 45–17.

Current standings

Modern club
Blackheath FC's first team currently plays in National Division 1 in England, but the club fields many sides. 
The mini and junior sections have their own home ground, based at Kidbrooke Road, Well Hall, London, SE9.
The club also has two women's teams, the first XV winning the Championship South East 2 League back to back in seasons 2015–16 and 2016–17.
The club provides sections ranging from under-6's right through to under-18's, and has experienced success at all levels. 
The mini section ran its first Mini Rugby Festival at Eltham College on 25 November 2007.
The club also runs a rugby academy, which started in its current format in 2013, for boys who wish to continue their academic studies alongside playing rugby. The academy is also based at Well Hall.

Notable players
See also :Category:Blackheath F.C. players

 David Allen – openside flanker who played at Club for 13 seasons between 2004 and 2016, scoring 147 league tries from 274 appearances and becoming the all-time top try scorer in tier 3.  Gained 8 caps for the England Counties XV as well as appearing for the Barbarians.
  Harold Dingwall Bateson.
  Thomas Batson
  Norman Bruce
  George Burton (rugby union)
  Mike Campbell-Lamerton.
  Charles Arthur Crompton, played in England's first international
  Walter Michael Dickson
  John Douglas
  Hector Forsayth
  Edward Fraser
  C.B. Fry
  John Gallagher, All Black and member of the team that won the inaugural Rugby World Cup in 1987.
  Stephen Gray, played for Canada 1987,91,95 World Cups.
  Thomas Gubb
  Stan Harris
  Dhani Jones
  Aadel Kardooni, England A
  JEC 'Birdie' Partridge
  Alexander William Pearson (born 1854)
  Charles Pillman. Played for England 18 times before WW1.
  Robert Pillman. Charles Pillman's younger brother who played for England against France in 1914 and was killed in Belgium in 1916
  Hamish Scott
  E H D Sewell sports writer and cricketer
  Charles Sherrard (1849–1938), played in England's first international
  Joe Simpson.
  Mickey Skinner "The Munch".
  Graham Standing
  Frederick Stokes (1850–1929), the first captain of the England national rugby union team.
  Lennard Stokes (1856–1933), former captain of the England national rugby union team.
  Henry Taylor (rugby union)
  Rob Webber.

Fictional players
 Dr. Watson, character from the Sherlock Holmes stories

Honours
 Middlesex Sevens (2): 1932, 1958
 Gala Sevens (1): 1957
 Kent Cup (16): 1891, 1972, 1977, 1978, 1980, 1981, 1982, 1983, 1984, 1985, 1986, 1987, 1996, 2003, 2009, 2013
 Glengarth Sevens Main Event (1): 1982
 Glengarth Sevens Davenport Plate (1): 1983
 National Division Three South (1): 2003–04

See also
 Rugby union in London

References

External links
 Official website

1858 establishments in England
Blackheath, London
Eltham
English rugby union teams
Rugby clubs established in 1858
Rugby union clubs in London
Rugby union in Kent
Sport in the Royal Borough of Greenwich